Ferenc Korom (born 15 December 1964) is a Hungarian military officer. He served as the Chief of the Hungarian Defence Forces from 2018 to 1 June 2021, when President János Áder dismissed him from the Chief of the HDF position. According to what the president said, Korom "fulfilled his duties with his best knowledge".

Korom speaks fluently in English.

Career 
1987-1990 MH 33. Mechanized Infantry Brigade, Zalaegerszeg

1990-2004 MH 62. Mechanized Infantry Brigade "Miklós  Bercsényi" , Hódmezővásárhely

2004-2007 MH 25. Infantry Brigade "György Klapka", Tata

2007-2008 MH Joint Forces Command, Székesfehérvár

2008-2011 MH 5. Infantry Brigade "István Bocskai", Debrecen

2011-2017 MH Operational Group Command, Budapest

2018 MH Joint Forces Command, Székesfehérvár

2018-2021 MH Chief of General Staff

Deployments and Missions 
September 30, 1997 – September 22, 1998. ENSZ UNFICYP, Company Commander (Cyprus)

September 16, 2003 – September 19, 2004 ENSZ UNFICYP, Contingent Commander (Cyprus)

February 26, 2005 – September 9, 2005 NATO Iraq Training Mission, Trainer Senior Officer (Iraq)

January 8, 2007 – Augustus 1, 2008 MH Guard and Insurer Battalion, Battalion Commander (KFOR, Kosovo)

February 24, 2009 – September 22, 2009 MH Provincial Reconstruction Team (Afghanistan)

February 11, 2013 – Augustus 31, 2013 MH ISAF Chief of Staff (ISAF, Afghanistan)

September 26, 2015 – September 25, 2016 KFOR Deputy Commander (Pristina)

Personal life 
Ferenc Korom is married and has one child.

He enjoys reading, fishing, and sporting.

References 

1964 births
Living people
Hungarian generals